WRJC (1270 AM, "Smash Country") is a radio station broadcasting a country music format. Licensed to Mauston, Wisconsin, United States, the station is currently owned by Murphy's Law Media Group, LLC and features programming from CBS News Radio. 
 WRJC-AM features Mauston Golden Eagles Athletics including: Football, Volleyball, Boys & Girls Basketball, Baseball & Softball

References

External links

RJC
Country radio stations in the United States
Juneau County, Wisconsin
Radio stations established in 1997